Richard Donovan (born  1966) is an Irish runner, commercial race organizer, and sports administrator. Donovan organised and was first to complete the inaugural South Pole Marathon in January 2002, then completed the first marathon-length run in the North Pole in April of that year. He used the publicity from this to launch his North Pole Marathon venture, offering runners an adventure tourism experience, with the 2018 event costing €16,000.

Between 30 January and 5 February 2009, Donovan claimed a worlds best for running seven marathons, on seven different continents, in fewer than seven days. Starting 1 February 2012 he improved on this by completing the 7 on 7 in under 120 hours.

Donovan has also completed transcontinental runs across North America in 2015 and Europe in 2016, adding South America in 2017. In addition to the North Pole Marathon, he organizes a number of other commercial events.

See also
Antarctic Ice Marathon & 100k ultra race
World Marathon Challenge
North Pole Marathon

References

1960s births
Living people
Irish male marathon runners
Sportspeople from County Galway